Vaduthala Nair, the Kshatriya/Warrior of Parayi petta panthirukulam, belongs to the present Kundully Nair family of Mezhathur, near Thrithala. This family took and raised the infant left behind by the Vararuchi couple while on the pilgrimage along the Nila River banks.
Vaduthala Nair was an expert in martial arts. He was a Nair soldier

References

Mythology